Take Off Your Pants and Jacket is the fourth studio album by American rock band Blink-182, released on June 12, 2001, by MCA Records. The band had spent much of the previous year traveling and supporting their previous album Enema of the State (1999), which launched their mainstream career. The album's title is a tongue-in-cheek pun on male masturbation ("take off your pants and jack it"), and its cover art has icons for each member of the trio: an airplane ("take off"), a pair of pants, and a jacket. It is the band's final release through MCA.

The album was recorded over three months at Signature Sound in San Diego with producer Jerry Finn. During the sessions, MCA executives pressured the band to retain the sound that helped their previous album sell millions. As such, Take Off Your Pants and Jacket continues the pop-punk tone that Blink-182 had honed and made famous, albeit with a heavier post-hardcore sound inspired by bands such as Fugazi and Refused. Regarding its lyrical content, it has been referred to as a concept album chronicling adolescence, with songs dedicated to first dates, fighting authority, and teenage parties. Due to differing opinions on direction, the trio worked in opposition to one another for the first time, and the sessions sometimes became contentious.

The album had near-immediate success, becoming the first punk rock record to debut at number one on the US Billboard 200 and achieving double platinum certification in May 2002. It produced three hit singles—"The Rock Show", "Stay Together for the Kids", and "First Date"—that were top-ten hits on modern rock charts. Critical impressions of the album were generally positive,  commending its expansion on teenage themes, although others viewed this as its weakness. To support the album, the band co-headlined the Pop Disaster Tour with Green Day. Take Off Your Pants and Jacket has sold over 14 million copies worldwide.

Background
After a long series of performances at clubs and festivals and several indie recordings during the 1990s, Blink-182 finally achieved mainstream success with the release of Enema of the State in 1999, which launched the band "into the stratosphere of pop music" and catapulted them to become the most popular punk act of the era. The glossy production set Blink-182 apart from the other crossover punk acts of the era, such as Green Day. Three singles were released from the record—"What's My Age Again?", "All the Small Things", and "Adam's Song"—that crossed over into Top 40 radio format and experienced major commercial success. The album sold over 15 million copies worldwide and had a considerable impact on pop punk music. The band spent most of 2000 touring in support of Enema of the State, where they headlined arenas for the first time. The band played to sold-out audiences and performed worldwide during the summer of 2000 on the Mark, Tom and Travis Show Tour.

The period following Enema of the State saw the band experience great transition. "We had gone from playing small clubs and sleeping on people's floors to headlining amphitheaters and staying in five-star hotels," recalled Hoppus in 2013. "After years of hard work, promotion, and nonstop touring, people knew who we were, and listened to what we were saying ... it scared the shit out of us." The band was rushed into recording the follow-up, as according to DeLonge, "the president of MCA was penalizing us an obscene amount of money because our record wasn't going to be out in time for them to make their quarterly revenue statements. [...] And we were saying, 'Hey, we can't do this right now, we need to reorganize ourselves and really think about what we want to do and write the best record we can.' They didn't agree with us."

Recording and production
The band recorded demos at DML Studios, a small practice studio in Escondido, California, where the band had written Dude Ranch and Enema of the State. The group had written a dozen songs after three weeks and invited their manager, Rick DeVoe, to be the first person outside Blink-182 to hear the new material, which the band found "catchy [but with] a definitive edge". DeVoe sat in the control room and quietly listened to the recordings, and pressed the band at the end on why there was no "Blink-182 good-time summer anthem [thing]". DeLonge and Hoppus were furious, remarking, "You want a fucking single? I'll write you the cheesiest, catchiest, throwaway fucking summertime single you've ever heard!" Hoppus went home and wrote lead single "The Rock Show" in ten minutes, and DeLonge similarly wrote "First Date", which became the most successful singles from the record and future live staples.

The band began proper tracking for drums soon afterwards at Larrabee Studios West and Cello Studios in Hollywood. The working relationship with Jerry Finn had been so fruitful that the same team was largely engaged for Take Off Your Pants and Jacket, with Finn producing and Joe McGrath engineering. Finn and McGrath, meticulous in acquiring the best sound, took two days to experiment with microphone placement, different compressors, and varying EQs before committing Barker's drums to tape. The waiting "drove [him] crazy," and Barker recorded his drum parts in "two or three days" while DeLonge and Hoppus watched television upstairs. When the drums were finished, the band returned to San Diego to record the bulk of Take Off Your Pants and Jacket at Signature Sound, where they had also recorded its predecessor. While the band worked with few days off, the sessions also proved to be memorable: "We took long dinner breaks, ate Sombrero burritos, watched Family Guy and Mr. Show, and laughed way too hard." When MCA Records executives eventually traveled to San Diego to hear the highly anticipated follow-up, the trio played a joke by only playing them two joke songs—"Fuck a Dog" and "When You Fucked Hitler" (the subject of which later changed to a grandfather)—and the executives "lost it," in DeLonge's words. MCA put pressure on the band to maintain the sound that made Enema of the State sell millions; as a result, DeLonge believed the album took no "creative leaps [or] bounds." As such, DeLonge felt creatively stifled and "bummed out" with the label's limitations.

The creative struggle was evident from the outset. Hoppus loved everything regarding Enema of the State—including the music videos and live show—and "wanted to do it again," desiring to create a bigger, better and louder follow-up. DeLonge, however, was striving for heavier and dirtier guitar-driven rock, which was inspired by post-hardcore bands Fugazi and Refused. Barker, "never simply a punk rock drummer," wanted to challenge himself and was listening to a great deal of hip hop and heavy metal. The lyrics often turned darker and more introspective for Hoppus, and "love songs became broken love songs." DeLonge rewrote some of his lyrics after listening to songs by Alkaline Trio, feeling as though he needed to "step up his game." DeLonge pushed his guitar style further away from that on Enema of the State: "Arpeggiated guitar hooks became frenetic 1/16th note spasms," wrote Hoppus in 2013. Barker's drum parts were looped and filtered, creating different sounds. For the first time, the trio worked in opposition to one another, and the sessions sometimes became contentious. Hoppus felt that the sessions created an unspoken competition between him and DeLonge, between who could write the better chorus or most clever lyrics. "Our confidence and insecurity begat some heated differences, sometime to the point where we had to leave rooms and cool down," recalled Hoppus. Finn would often smooth over differences with a joke, offering a fresh perspective and advice.

In 2013, Hoppus referred to Take Off Your Pants and Jacket as the "permanent record of a band in transition ... our confused, contentious, brilliant, painful, cathartic leap into the unknown."

Packaging

The title is a tongue-in-cheek pun on male masturbation ("take off your pants and jack it"). Previous titles had included If You See Kay (a pun on the spelling of "fuck") and Genital Ben, accompanied by a bear on the cover of the album (a reference to Gentle Ben). Stressed at being at a loss for a name, DeLonge asked guitar tech Larry Palm for suggestions. The album's title was coined by Palm, who was snowboarding on a rainy day. Inside the lodge, Palm was congregating with friends when a young kid walked in completely drenched, to which his mother suggested he "take off [his] pants and jacket." Palm was told by DeLonge that if the band were to use the name, he would "hook him up". Instead, Palm received a letter from manager Rick DeVoe for his contribution, which offered a $500 payout for the name. Palm scoffed at the amount, and filed suit in 2003 with the intellectual property attorney Ralph Loeb, alleging breach of contract and fraud against the band. Palm demanded $20,000; the band eventually settled out of court for $10,000.

The cover has three "Zoso-like" icons for each band member: a jacket, a pair of pants and an airplane. Delonge and Hoppus' symbols became the pants and jacket, respectively, leaving Barker the airplane despite begging his bandmates not to assign him the symbol, citing his fear of flying, but he took it anyway. Journalist Joe Shooman called the title "a glint of sharp intelligence behind the boys' humour as it draws oblique attention to the fact that, latterly, Blink-182 had often been encouraged to get naked in order to promote themselves. It's a very self-aware album title in that context and a portent, perhaps, of what was to come".

Composition and lyrics

Take Off Your Pants and Jacket has been called a concept album chronicling adolescence and associated feelings. It has been considered pop-punk and punk rock. The band did not consider them explicitly teenage songs: "The things that happen to you in high school are the same things that happen your entire life," said Hoppus. "You can fall in love at sixty; you can get rejected at eighty." The record begins with "Anthem Part Two", which touches on disenchantment and blames adults for teenage problems. It serves as the opposite of the band's typical "party" image presented to the media, with heavily politically-charged lyrics. Joe Shooman called it a "generational manifesto that exhorts kids to be wary of the system that surrounds them". "Online Songs" was written by Hoppus about "the thoughts that drive you crazy" in the aftermath of a breakup, and is essentially a follow-up to "Josie". "First Date" was inspired by DeLonge and then wife Jennifer Jenkins' first date at SeaWorld in San Diego. "I was about 21 at the time and it was an excuse for me to take her somewhere because I wanted to hang out with her," said DeLonge. The track was written as a summary of neurotic teen angst and awkwardness. "Happy Holidays, You Bastard" is a joke track intended to "piss parents off." The fifth track, "Story of a Lonely Guy", concerns heartache and rejection prior to the high school prom. The song is downbeat and melancholy, filtered through "tuneful guitar lines reminiscent of The Cure and hefty drum patterns".

The following track, "The Rock Show", is the opposite: an upbeat "effervescent celebration of love, life and music". It was written as a "fast punk-rock love song" in the vein of the Ramones and Screeching Weasel. The song tells the story of two teenagers meeting a rock concert, and, despite failing grades and disapproving parents, falling and staying in love. It was inspired by the band's early days in San Diego's all-ages venue SOMA. "Stay Together for the Kids" follows and is written about divorce from the point of view of a helpless child. Inspired by DeLonge's parents' divorce, it is one of the band's darker songs. "Roller Coaster" was written when Hoppus had a nightmare when he and his wife, Skye, first began dating; the song is about finding something ideal but fearing for its certain departure. "Reckless Abandon" was penned by DeLonge as a reflection on summer memories, including parties, skateboarding and trips to the beach. "Everytime I Look for You" has no specific lyrical basis, according to Hoppus, and "Give Me One Good Reason" was written about punk music and nonconformity in a high school setting. "Shut Up", a "broken-family snapshot", revisits the territory of youthful woes, described by Shooman as a "fairly familiar rites-of-passage tale" that "adds to general themes of isolation, alienation and moving on to a new place that pervade Take Off Your Pants and Jacket". "Please Take Me Home" concludes the standard edition of the album and was written about the consequences of a friendship developing into a relationship.

Several bonus tracks follow on separate editions; some continue the teenage theme, while others are joke tracks. Barker used Afro-Cuban influences for his drum track on "Don't Tell Me It's Over", and DeLonge used something other than his punk influences for "What Went Wrong".  While DeLonge felt "staple acoustic songs" were big for groups at the time (such as Green Day's "Good Riddance"), the band wrote all of their songs from their inception on acoustic guitars, and he felt he would rather have "What Went Wrong" in its original form. "You grow up and realize, 'Fuck! Who gives a fuck about punk rock?'" he said. "There are so many great forms of music out there, and you grow beyond wanting to listen to or write something because your parents will hate it."  Producer Jerry Finn suggested lyrics for the song after viewing a documentary on the first Soviet nuclear test; in the film, an aged Soviet physicist says of watching the explosion, "There was a loud boom, and then the bomb began fiercely kicking at the world."

Release and reception

Promotion and commercial performance

To promote Take Off Your Pants and Jacket, MCA Records released three singles, "The Rock Show", "First Date" and "Stay Together for the Kids", all of which were top ten hits on Billboard Modern Rock Tracks chart. Blink-182 performed on the Late Show with David Letterman and Late Night with Conan O'Brien in support of Take Off Your Pants and Jacket. The band also appeared in a MADtv sketch, in which the trio stars as misfits in an all-American 1950s family (a parody Leave It to Beaver). The trio also sanctioned a band biography, Tales from Beneath Your Mom (2001), which was written by the trio and Anne Hoppus (sister of Mark Hoppus).

Take Off Your Pants and Jacket was released in June 2001, and the album debuted at number one on the US Billboard 200 chart, with first-week sales of 350,000 copies. Billboard attributed the success of the record overall as a result of the success of the first single, "The Rock Show". The album debuted at number one on the Canadian Albums Chart, selling 47,390 copies. It also reached number one on Germany's Top 100 Albums. The album was the first album identified as punk rock to debut at number one in the United States. The record shipped enough units to be certified platinum, and was certified double platinum in May 2002. Shortly after the release of Take Off Your Pants and Jacket, the Federal Trade Commission's report charged MCA and Blink-182 with marketing explicit material to children. Take Off Your Pants and Jacket has sold over 14 million copies worldwide as of 2011.

Editions

The record was initially released in three separate configurations: the "red plane", the "yellow pants" and the "green jacket" editions. Each release contained two separate bonus tracks, ranging from joke tracks to outtakes. The only outward signs to differentiate the three editions were three stickers. The multiple bonus-track versions were only available for a limited time before being replaced by an edition without any bonus tracks.

In 2011, the Brooklyn-based independent record label Mightier Than Sword Records licensed Take Off Your Pants and Jacket to reissue on 180-gram vinyl, with three additional 7-inch singles featuring the six bonus tracks. After taking preorders, the company "ran out of money", resulting in Shop Radio Cast taking over the project; the LP was eventually released in May 2013. Hoppus spoke on the subject of Mightier Than Sword's delay in an interview with Alternative Press: "It's honestly something that is out of our control and not something that we are happy about happening at all."

Critical reception

Critical reception of Take Off Your Pants and Jacket in 2001 was generally positive. Rob Sheffield of Rolling Stone was generally the most effusive of the positive reviews, praising the unpretentious attitude of the band: "As they plow in their relatively un-self-conscious way through the emotional hurdles of lust, terror, pain and rage, they reveal more about themselves and their audience than they even intend to, turning adolescent malaise into a friendly joke rather than a spiritual crisis." Darren Ratner of AllMusic felt likewise, writing that the record is "one of their finest works to date, with almost every track sporting a commanding articulation and new-school punk sounds. They've definitely put a big-time notch in the win column". People commended the "adrenaline-laced sonic gems reveling in Blink's patented, potty-mouthed humor, recommended only for adolescents of all ages". British publication Q offered the sentiment that "when they stop arsing around for the sake of it, Blink-182 write some very good pop songs". Kerrang! gave it a high-profile review, calling the record "eminently hummable dummy-spitting tantrum rock for the emo generation".

The Village Voice called the sound "emo-core ... intercut with elegiac little pauses that align Blink 182 with a branch of punk rock you could trace back through The Replacements and Ramones Leave Home, to the more ethereal of early Who songs". Aaron Scott of Slant Magazine, however, found the sound to be recycled from the band's previous efforts, writing, "Blink shines when they deviate from their formula, but it is awfully rare ... The album seems to be more concerned with maintaining the band's large teenage fanbase than with expanding their overall audience." Entertainment Weekly felt similarly, with David Browne opining that "the album is angrier and more teeth gnashing than you'd expect. The band work so hard at it, and the music is such processed sounding mainstream rock played fast, that the album becomes a paradox: adolescent energy and rebellion made joyless". British magazine New Musical Express, who heavily criticized the band in their previous efforts, felt no more negative this time, saying "Blink-182 are now indistinguishable from the increasingly tedious 'teenage dirtbag' genre they helped spawn". The magazine continued, "It  like all that sanitised, castrated, shrink-wrapped 'new wave' crap that the major US record companies pumped out circa 1981 in their belated attempt to jump on the 'punk' bandwagon."

More recent reviews have subsequently been positive. Website AbsolutePunk, in part of their "Retro Reviews" project in 2011, called Take Off Your Pants and Jacket the band's best effort; reviewer Thomas Nassiff referred to it as "a transitory record for Blink-182, but you can't tell just by listening to it on its own. It's developed and it's full – it feels holistically complete, dick jokes and all". In 2005, the album was ranked number 452 in Rock Hard magazine's book The 500 Greatest Rock & Metal Albums of All Time.

Accolades

* denotes an unordered list

Touring

The Take Off Your Pants and Jacket supporting tour began in April 2001 in Australia and New Zealand. The band returned to the US to promote their new record on the Late Show with David Letterman in June 2001. Afterwards, the band set out on the 2001 Honda Civic Tour, for which the trio designed a Honda Civic to promote the company. The band again received criticism for "selling out", but the band argued by way of mitigation that their tickets were consistently offered at lower prices than those of other groups of their stature, and by accepting corporate links they could continue to give fans a good deal. In December 2001, the trio played at a series of radio-sponsored holiday concerts, and also appeared as presenters at the 2001 Billboard Music Awards in Las Vegas.

The band rescheduled European tour dates in the aftermath of the September 11 attacks. "After the attacks the world kind of went into freeze mode and we didn't know whether to carry on with things or not ... so we decided we'd rather everyone was safe and play the shows a little later instead," said Hoppus shortly thereafter. The European dates were canceled a second time after DeLonge suffered a herniated disc in his back. With time off from touring, DeLonge felt an "itch to do something where he didn't feel locked in to what Blink was", and channeled his chronic back pain and resulting frustration into Box Car Racer (2002), a post-hardcore disc that further explores his Fugazi and Refused inspiration. Refraining from paying for a studio drummer, he invited Barker to record drums on the project, which led Hoppus to feel betrayed. The event caused great division within the trio for some time and an unresolved tension at the forefront of the band's later hiatus.

In 2002, the band co-headlined the Pop Disaster Tour with Green Day. The tour was conceived by Blink-182 to echo the famous Monsters of Rock tours; the idea was to have, effectively, a Monsters of Punk tour. The tour, from the band's point of view, had been put together as a show of unity in the face of consistent accusations of rivalry between the two bands, especially in Europe. Instead, Green Day's Tré Cool acknowledged in a Kerrang! interview that they committed to the tour as an opportunity to regain their reputation as a great live band, as they felt their spotlight had faded over the years. "We set out to reclaim our throne as the most incredible live punk band from you know who," said Cool. Cool contended that "we heard they were going to quit the tour because they were getting smoked so badly ... We didn't want them to quit the tour. They're good for filling up the seats up front." Several reviewers were unimpressed with Blink-182's headlining set following Green Day. "Sometimes playing last at a rock show is more a curse than a privilege ... Pity the headliner, for instance, that gets blown off the stage by the band before it. Blink-182 endured that indignity Saturday at the Shoreline Amphitheatre," a reporter for the San Francisco Chronicle wrote in 2002.

The band released a second DVD of home videos, live performances and music videos titled The Urethra Chronicles II: Harder Faster Faster Harder in 2002. Likewise, the 2003 film Riding in Vans with Boys follows the Pop Disaster Tour throughout the U.S.

Track listing

Notes
 On the clean version of the album the track "Happy Holidays, You Bastard" is listed as just "Happy Holidays", and is an instrumental with the exception of the very last line, due to nearly every other line containing strong language and/or crude sexual references.
 On the limited edition bonus track versions, "Please Take Me Home" has 182 seconds (roughly 3 minutes) of silence at the end, likely to hide the hidden tracks, and also to reference their name. (They are not listed on the back cover)

Personnel

Blink-182
 Mark Hoppus – bass guitar, vocals
 Tom DeLonge – guitars, vocals
 Travis Barker – drums, percussion

Artwork
 Tim Stedman – art direction, design
 Marcos Orozco – design
 Justin Stephens – photography
 Intersection Studio – symbol design

Additional musicians
 Roger Joseph Manning, Jr. – keyboards

Production
 Jerry Finn – production
 Tom Lord-Alge – mixing
 Joe McGrath – engineering
 Joe Marlett – assistant engineer
 Ted Reiger – assistant engineer
 Robert Read – assistant engineer
 Femio Hernandez – mixing assistant
 Mike "Sack" Fasano – drum tech
 Brian Gardner – mastering

Charts

Weekly charts

Year-end charts

Certifications

See also
 List of number-one albums of 2001 (U.S.)

Notes

References

External links

 Take Off Your Pants and Jacket at YouTube (streamed copy where licensed)
 

2001 albums
Albums produced by Jerry Finn
Blink-182 albums
MCA Records albums